Zerna may refer to:
Zerna Sharp (1889-1981), American author
Pizzo Zerna, mountain of Italy
Zerna, Iran, city in East Azerbaijan Province, Iran